Moritz Hermann of Limburg, (born 1664, died 1703), count of Limburg Stirum was the second reigning count of the branch Limburg-Styrum-Styrum.

Early life 
He was son of Count Moritz of Limburg-Stirum and his wife Countess Maria Bernhardine of Limburg-Bronckhorst (1637-1713)

Personal life 
He married in 1692 Countess Elisabeth Dorothea von Leiningen-Dagsburg-Falkenburg (1665-1722), daughter of Count Emich Christian of Leiningen-Dagsburg-Falkenburg and his wife Countess Christine Luise von Daun-Falkenstein (1640-1702). They had issue:

 Christian Otto, count of Limburg Bronkhorst and Stirum (born 1694, died 1749);
 Johann Philipp Wilhelm, count of Limburg Stirum (born 1695, died 1758);
 Bernhard Alexander, born 1698 and died 1758. He married in 1740 Countess Luise von Wiser (born 1711, died 1786);
 Maria Ludowika, born 1699, died 1719, a nun in Köln;
 Karl Moritz, born 1701 and died 1744.
 Johann Ludwig, born 1702 and died 1706.

Sources 
 De takken Gemen en Styrum van het geslacht van Limburg Stirum; Dr. A.J. Bonke; Stichting van Limburg Stirum; 's-Gravenhage, 2007
 Iconografie van het Geslacht van Limburg Stirum; C.J. Graaf van Limburg Stirum; Walburg Instituut, Amsterdam, 1994

Counts of Limburg Stirum
1650 births
1703 deaths